Jorge de Almeida was the 10th & 12th Governor of Portuguese Ceylon. de Almeida was first appointed in 1631 under Philip III of Portugal, he was Governor until 1633 and then in 1635 until 1636. He was succeeded by Diogo de Melo de Castro both times.

References

Governors of Portuguese Ceylon
16th-century Portuguese people
17th-century Portuguese people